Fahnhorst is a surname. Notable people with the surname include:

Jim Fahnhorst (born 1958), American football player
Keith Fahnhorst (1952–2018), American football player